Piece for Clarinet and String Orchestra/Mobiles is an album by American jazz composer and arranger Jimmy Giuffre which was released on the Verve label in 1960.

Critical reception

Allmusic awarded the album 3 stars.

Track listing 
All compositions by Jimmy Giuffre.
 "Piece for Clarinet and String Orchestra"
 "Movement 1" - 6:22
 "Movement 2" - 4:05
 "Movement 3" - 2:40
 "Movement 4" - 2:35
 "Movement 5" - 2:05
 "Mobiles"
 "Movement 1" - 1:00
 "Movement 2" - 1:32
 "Movement 3" - 0:45
 "Movement 4" - 1:28
 "Movement 5" - 2:08
 "Movement 6" - 0:50
 "Movement 7" - 2:17
 "Movement 8" - 0:23
 "Movement 9" - 1:58
 "Movement 10" - 0:38
 "Movement 11" - 0:51
 "Movement 12" - 0:32
 "Movement 13" - 1:47
 "Movement 14" - 1:03
 "Movement 15" - 1:14
 "Movement 16" - 0:58

Personnel 
Jimmy Giuffre - clarinet
The Südwestfunk Orchestra of Baden-Baden conducted by Wolfram Röhrig

References 

Jimmy Giuffre albums
1960 albums
Verve Records albums